Sfi1 homolog, spindle assembly associated (yeast) is a protein that in humans is encoded by the SFI1 gene.
 It localizes to the centriole, and its S. pombe ortholog has been shown to be involved in spindle pole body duplication. SFI1 forms a complex with centrin 2.

References

Further reading 

 
 
 
 
 
 
 
 
 
Rüthnick D, Vitale J, Neuner A, Schiebel E. The N-terminus of Sfi1 and yeast centrin Cdc31 provide the assembly site for a new spindle pole body. J Cell Biol. 2021 Mar 1;220(3):e202004196. doi: 10.1083/jcb.202004196. PMID: 33523111; PMCID: PMC7852455.

External links